Scaglia's tuco-tuco (Ctenomys scagliai) is a species of rodent in the family Ctenomyidae. It is endemic to a locality in Tucumán Province, northern Argentina. The species is named after Argentine naturalist Galileo Juan Scaglia (1915–1989). Its karyotype has 2n = 36 and FN = 64.

References

Mammals of Argentina
Tuco-tucos
Endemic fauna of Argentina
Mammals described in 1999